The NSW Environment Protection Authority (EPA) is an independent statutory authority that sits in the Environment portfolio as part of the Planning, Industry and Environment cluster. The NSW EPA was established as an independent governing Board in February 2012 separate from the Office of Environment and Heritage. The NSW EPA is the State’s primary environmental regulator, working with businesses, government, community and environment groups to manage and reduce pollution, waste and adverse impacts on the environment.

The EPA’s vision is a "Healthy Environment, Healthy Community and Healthy Business". The vision goes to the heart of the objectives under the Protection of the Environment Administration Act 1991 (POEA Act):

 to protect, restore and enhance the quality of the environment in NSW, having regard to the need to maintain ecologically sustainable development;
 to reduce the risks to human health and prevent the degradation of the environment.

History
The NSW EPA was established originally in 1991 as an independent agency under the Protection of the Environment Administration Act.

Between 2003 and 2012, the EPA was incorporated into the Department of Environment and Conservation. Following a significant pollution incident at Kooragang Island in Newcastle in August 2011, an independent review recommended that an EPA be re-formed as an independent agency.

The agency was subsequently re-established in February 2012 as a statutory authority with an independent governing Board.

The EPA has offices in Albury, Armidale, Bathurst, Broken Hill, Coffs Harbour, Dubbo, Grafton, Griffith, Kempsey, Newcastle, Parramatta, Queanbeyan, Sydney and Wollongong.

Activities of the EPA

The EPA regulates activities that can impact the environment and human health, including: 
 Air, water and noise pollution
 Waste and resource recovery
 Contaminated land
 Dangerous goods
 Chemicals and hazardous materials
 Pesticides
 Radiation and solaria (tanning units)
 Native forestry
 Coal seam gas projects.
The EPA Strategic Plan 2017–21 lists the criteria against which the EPA must perform.

Legislation and Compliance

The Environment Protection Authority has responsibilities and powers under a range of NSW environmental legislation.

Acts administered by the NSW EPA

The Protection of the Environment Operations Act 1997 (POEO Act)
Protection of the Environment Operations Act 1997 (POEO Act) is the key piece of environment protection legislation administered by the EPA.

The object of the Act is to achieve the protection, restoration and enhancement of the quality of the NSW environment. The Act repealed and consolidated a number of existing Acts to rationalise, simplify and strengthen the regulatory framework for environmental protection in NSW.

See also 

 Waste management in Australia

References

External links 

 

2012 establishments in Australia
Government agencies established in 2012
Environment
Environmental agencies of country subdivisions
Environmental agencies in Australia
Regulatory authorities of Australia